The 2021 AFF Futsal Cup was the sixth edition of AFF Futsal Cup. The tournament was held in Nakhon Ratchasima, Thailand from 13 to 17 September 2021.

The defending champion was Chonburi Bluewave and they became champions 2 times in a row.

Participants
 FreeFire Bluewave Chonburi (Host)
 Port (Host)
 Pahang Rangers
 Selangor MAC
 Mohahang All Star

Venue
Terminal 21 Hall Nakhon Rachasima, Thailand

Standing

Match

Winner

References

AFF Futsal Club Championship
International futsal competitions hosted by Thailand
Sport in Nakhon Ratchasima province
AFF Futsal Cup
AFF Futsal Cup